Vista Bank is a Texas bank established in 1912. Currently headquartered in Dallas, Texas, Vista Bank operates 12 locations throughout Texas. 

The bank, a subsidiary of Vista Bancshares, finished Q4 2020 with $1.3B in assets. 

During the COVID-19 pandemic, Vista Bank offered the Main Street Lending Program to small and middle market Texas companies seeking funding. Participating in both Round One and Round Two of the Paycheck Protection Program (PPP), Vista was one of the top 25 funders to North Texas small businesses.

Services 
A member of Federal Deposit Insurance Corporation (FDIC) and an Equal Housing Lender, Vista Bank conducts commercial and personal banking across the state of Texas. The bank's website states that they provide:   

 Commercial lending;
 Treasury management;
 Small business banking;
 Private banking;
 Consumer banking.

References

Banks based in Texas
Banks based in the Dallas–Fort Worth metroplex
Banks established in 1912
Companies listed on the Nasdaq
Companies based in Texas
Financial services companies of the United States